Škrjanče (in older sources also Škrjance) is a small settlement just south of Ivančna Gorica in the historical Lower Carniola region in central Slovenia. The Municipality of Ivančna Gorica is included in the Central Slovenia Statistical Region.

References

External links
Škrjanče on Geopedia

Populated places in the Municipality of Ivančna Gorica